Dead Space is a 1991 American science-fiction horror film directed by Fred Gallo and produced by Mike Elliott.

Plot
In the research facility on the planet Phablos, a virus is created in a botched experiment which turns those infected into monsters. An emergency distress call is sent from the lab. 
A spacecraft crewed by Commander Steve Krieger and robot sidekick Tinpan respond to the emergency call from the planet, but their craft is attacked and damaged on the way to Phablos.

Upon their arrival at Phablos, those in charge of the laboratory explain that they have managed to contain the virus. Krieger accepts the lab's claims and begins repairs on his ship. The scientist had not been entirely honest with Krieger, and had been attempting to study the virus rather than contain it.

Unfortunately, the virus escapes and infects a lab worker, leaving the lab to  face a killer virus that turns them into alien monsters.

Krieger and Tinpan attempt to stop the monster, but their weapons prove ineffective. One of the lab workers develops a bioweapon that proves effective in stopping the monster.

Production
The movie is a remake of the 1982, Roger Corman-produced horror film Subject 20 and while there are minor differences, it still retains the original new main storyline and new character set-up. Singer said that he had fun shooting the movie, and felt that it was an "unpretentious, rip-roaring space adventure." The film had a working title of Biohazard. Some of the space battle effects were reused from Battle Beyond the Stars.

The effects team wanted a monster different from anything that had been seen before, a task made more complicatied as the movie was shot in three weeks. An inner harness was developed which allowed for rapid mobility of the actor in the monster suit. GM foam and hair inserts were used to show the transformation of human into monster.

Cast
 Marc Singer as Commander Steve Krieger
 Laura Tate as Dr. Marissa Salinger
 Bryan Cranston as Dr. Frank Darden
 Judith Chapman as Dr. Emily Stote
 Randy Reinholz as Tim
 Frank Roman as Sal Dickens
 Lori Lively as Jill Tollman
 Greg Blanchard as Joe
 Rodger Halston  as Tinpan (as Rodger Hall)
 Liz Rogers as Devon Latham

Reception
Tv Guide found the movie a weak entry into the man versus monster genre. It felt it borrowed heavily from Alien and Star Wars and had many plot holes. While Gorezone liked the technical aspects of the monster effect, it preferred the original Forbidden World to this remake. It also stated that the monster seemed more of a mutant dinosaur than mutated human. IGN found the movie to be a typical Corman movie, but that the movie was notable for Bryan Cranston in one of his earliest roles.

Home release
In 2010, Shout! Factory released the film on DVD, packaged as a double feature with The Terror Within as part of the Roger Corman's Cult Classics collection. The film is in fullscreen aspect ratio. IGN called the transfer "[...] incredibly faded and murky, with dust and dirt present throughout, and even some annoying digital artifacting."

As of January 2022, the movie is available to stream for free on many sites, including Tubi, Plex and the Shout streaming app

References

External links
 
 
 

1991 films
1991 independent films
1990s American films
1990s English-language films
1990s monster movies
1990s science fiction action films
1990s science fiction horror films
American independent films
American monster movies
American robot films
American science fiction action films
American science fiction horror films
American space adventure films
Films directed by Fred Gallo
Films set on fictional planets
Remakes of American films